Phillip Bellingham (born 24 February 1991) is an Australian cross-country skier from Mount Beauty, Victoria. He represented Australia at the 2014 Winter Olympics in Sochi, Russia, and at the 2018 Winter Olympics in PyeongChang, South Korea.

Competition record

References

External links

1991 births
Cross-country skiers at the 2014 Winter Olympics
Cross-country skiers at the 2018 Winter Olympics
Cross-country skiers at the 2022 Winter Olympics
Living people
Olympic cross-country skiers of Australia
Australian male cross-country skiers
Federation University Australia alumni
People from Mount Beauty, Victoria
Competitors at the 2015 Winter Universiade
21st-century Australian people